Boing is an African television channel operated by Warner Bros. Discovery through its International unit, which launched on May 30, 2015. A localization of the eponymous Italian television service, the channel airs programming primarily from sister channels Cartoon Network and Boomerang, as well as those from other producers.

At this moment, the channel can be seen on Montage Cable TV in Nigeria and Sentech's Mobile TV in South Africa. On January 1, 2017, the channel became available to AzamTV subscribers. The channel does not have a website. The French version of Boing is also broadcast in Sub-Saharan Africa and the Maghreb.

Programming
 Angelo Rules
 Angels of Jarm
Arthur
 Batman: The Brave and the Bold
 Ben 10
 Camp Lazlo
 Codename: Kids Next Door
 Courage the Cowardly Dog
 Dexter's Laboratory
   Oggy And The Cockroaches
   Zig & Sharko 
 DreamWorks Dragons
 Foster's Home for Imaginary Friends
 The Garfield Show
 Green Lantern: The Animated Series
 The Grim Adventures of Billy and Mandy
 Hi Hi Puffy AmiYumi
 Johnny Bravo
 Johnny Test
 The Life and Times of Juniper Lee
 My Gym Partner's a Monkey
 The Powerpuff Girls
 Sonic Boom 
 ThunderCats
 Total Drama Island
 Yo-kai Watch

References

Boing (TV channel)
2015 establishments in England
Children's television networks
Companies based in Cape Town
Television channels and stations established in 2015
Boomerang (TV network)
Turner Broadcasting System Europe
Warner Bros. Discovery EMEA